Cheshmeh-ye Sang Band may refer to:
 Cheshmeh-ye Sang Band (1)
 Cheshmeh-ye Sang Band (2)